Moskvin Pochinok is a rural locality (a village) in Verkhneshardengskoye Rural Settlement, Velikoustyugsky District, Vologda Oblast, Russia. The population was 6 as of 2002.

Geography 
Moskvin Pochinok is located 81 km southwest of Veliky Ustyug (the district's administrative centre) by road. Priluki is the nearest rural locality.

References 

Rural localities in Velikoustyugsky District